The Mark Curtis Memorial Weekend of Champions was an annual professional wrestling memorial event produced by the Southern States Wrestling (SSW) promotion, and which was held from 2000 to 2003. The show was SSW's tribute to wrestling referee Mark Curtis who worked for the promotion days before his death. The event was part of the Children's Miracle Network's annual fundraiser. All of the proceeds from the show were donated to the organization and SSW wrestlers took part in the East Tennessee portion of its national telethon. The 2003 edition was a benefit show for the American Cancer Society. The Weekend of Champions was also promoted as a "Legend's Reunion" pro wrestling convention and featured induction ceremonies into the Kingsport Wrestling Hall of Fame.

Show results

First Annual Mark Curtis Memorial Weekend of Champions
The First Annual Mark Curtis Memorial Weekend of Champions was a two-day professional wrestling memorial show produced by Southern States Wrestling (SSW). The first show took place on May 12, 2000, in Saltville, Virginia and was headlined by "Ragin Bull'" Manny Fernandez. The main show was held the following night at the Civic Auditorium in Kingsport, Tennessee. "Chief" Wahoo McDaniels was also inducted into the Kingsport Wrestling Hall of Fame.

The main event was Ricky Harrison and The Iron Cross defending the SSW Tag Team Championship against The Family ("Handsome" Beau James and K. C. Thunder) in a Loser Leaves SSW match. James and Thunder won the match after special guest referee PJ Sharpe, their former manager, "turned heel" by hitting Harrison with a briefcase from behind and making a fast count. One of the featured matches on the undercard was The War Machine (with Chuck Jones) versus Tracey Smothers for the SSW Heavyweight Championship, which The War Machine won by pinfall. The other was Manny Fernandez versus Ron Ray and Boris Dragoff in a first-ever 3-Way Mexican Death match, which Fernandez won by climbing the corner turnbuckle and waving the flag.

First Night
May 12, 2000 in Saltville, Virginia

Second Night
May 13, 2000 in Kingsport, Tennessee (Civic Auditorium)

Second Annual Mark Curtis Memorial Weekend of Champions
The Second Annual Mark Curtis Memorial Weekend of Champions was a two-day professional wrestling memorial show produced by Southern States Wrestling (SSW). The first show took place on May 11, 2001, as a fundraiser for Central Elementary School in Johnson City, Tennessee. The main show was held the following night at the Civic Auditorium in Kingsport, Tennessee. The Kingsport Wrestling Hall of Fame induction ceremony for the Class of 2001 took place. Wild Bill Canny, one of East Tennessee's most infamous "heels" during the 1950s, led the class, which included referees Melvin Johnson and Ron West, wrestlers Sandy Scott, Buddy Landell, Arn Anderson, and SSW Commissioner Ken Bowles. As part of the Hall of Fame weekend, Ron West refereed a "Legend's match" that same night pitting Don Wright and Wayne Rogers against Hoot Gibson and Indian Harry which ended in a double disqualification.

The main event was a Steel Cage match for the SSW Tag Team Championship between then-champions The Batten Twins (Brad and Bart Batten) and The Family ("Handsome" Beau James and K. C. Thunder), with the added stipulation the losing team would leave the promotion for an entire year. Another featured match was a tag team "challenge match" in which the team of Tim Horner and Cody Michaels defeated the team Buddy Landel and Terry Taylor. On the undercard, Ricky Harrison and Tracy Smothers fought in a no-disqualification grudge match. An interpromotional Champion vs. Champion match was also held between Nationwide Championship Wrestling's Bull Pain and NWA Mid-America's Todd Morton, which Bull Pain won.

First Night

Second Night

Third Annual Mark Curtis Memorial Weekend of Champions
The Third Annual Mark Curtis Memorial Weekend of Champions was a two-day professional wrestling memorial show produced by Southern States Wrestling (SSW), which took place from May 10–11, 2002, at the Civic Auditorium in Kingsport, Tennessee. The Kingsport Wrestling Hall of Fame induction ceremony for the Class of 2002 took place. Paul Steele, a former Tennessee state athletic commissioner, led the class. Other inductees included wrestlers Kim Birchfied, Charlie Peters and Tim Horner. Bud Adams, who portrayed masked wrestler The Spoiler, was inducted posthumously. Other special guests included Ivan Koloff, Sandy Scott and the family of the late Whitey Caldwell. Prior to the show, a ten-bell salute was held for Randy Anderson, Lou Thesz, and Wahoo McDaniel, the latter a 2000 inductee.

The main event was Ricky Harrison's retirement match against Terry Taylor, which Harrison won. There were two other featured bouts on the undercard. The first was a tag team bout between Beau James and The War Machine and SSW Tag Team Champions K. C. Thunder and Steve Flynn. The other was a match between Shane Douglas and Tim Horner, which Douglas won via disqualification. Jimmy Valiant defeated George South in a "Legend's match".

First Night
May 10, 2002 in Kingsport, Tennessee (Civic Auditorium)

Second Night
May 11, 2002 in Kingsport, Tennessee (Civic Auditorium)

Fourth Annual Mark Curtis Memorial Weekend of Champions
The Fourth Annual Mark Curtis Memorial Weekend of Champions was a two-day professional wrestling memorial show produced by Southern States Wrestling (SSW), which took place from May 9–10, 2003, at the Civic Auditorium in Kingsport, Tennessee. Unlike previous years, the 2003 edition was held as a benefit show for the American Cancer Society. The Kingsport Wrestling Hall of Fame induction ceremony for the Class of 2003 took place. Sensational Sherri, who spent her early career in the NWA's Memphis territory, led the class. Other inductees included the Fuller and Golden wrestling families. Robert Fuller and Jimmy Golden accepted the award on their families behalf. Ken Bowles, a 2001 inductee, announced his resignation as SSW Commissioner and named ring announcer Joe Wheeler as his successor.

The main event was an impromptu SSW Heavyweight Championship match between Robbie Cassidy and Jeff Tankersley. Cassidy had won the title from Jesse Taylor the previous night in Greeneville, Tennessee and was originally scheduled to face him in a rematch. Cassidy retained the title via disqualification when Sensational Sherri, who had teamed with Tankersley in a mixed tag team match earlier that night, hit Cassidy with a "low blow" and allowed his opponent to steal the heavyweight title. Another featured bout was a No Holds Barred tag team match between the team of Beau James and K. C. Thunder (with "The Duke" Allan Barrie) and the team of Robert Fuller and Jimmy Golden, which saw James pin Fuller. Also on the card, The Batten Twins successfully defended the SSW Tag Team Championship against Flex Armstrong and Thorn, and Jimmy Valiant (with Jim White) defeated The Assassin in a "Legend's match".

First Night
May 9, 2003 in Greeneville, Tennessee

Second Night (Afternoon)
May 10, 2003 in Kingsport, Tennessee (Civic Auditorium)

Second Night (Evening)
May 10, 2003 in Kingsport, Tennessee (Civic Auditorium)

References

Professional wrestling memorial shows
Professional wrestling in Tennessee